Superheat is a live album by Dutch alternative rock band The Gathering, released on 25 January 2000 by Century Media. The album was recorded at Paradiso, Amsterdam, Netherlands on 16 April 1999, with the exception of "Rescue Me" & "Strange Machines", which were recorded at 013, Tilburg, Netherlands on 28 February 1999.

The album was produced by The Gathering, recorded and engineered by Jan Schuurman at 'The Van' Mobile Studio. The album was mixed by Jan Schuurman Raymond Tabak & The Gathering at 'The Van' Home Studio, Spakenburg, Netherlands during the Summer of 1999. The album was mastered by Paul Schuurman on 1 October 1999 at 'The Van' Home Studio.

In refrigeration, superheat is the amount of heat added to the refrigerant after it has changed from liquid state into a vapor state.

Track listing

Personnel
 Anneke van Giersbergen – lead vocals, guitars
 René Rutten – guitars
 Frank Boeijen – keyboards
 Hugo Prinsen Geerligs – bass
 Hans Rutten – drums

References

The Gathering (band) albums
2000 live albums
Century Media Records live albums